Bagge is a Swedish family originally of Norwegian background from Marstrand, Bohuslän, by Nils Fredriksson Bagge, burgher and mayor of Marstrand in the 17th century. According to Danmarks Adels Aarbog, the yearbook of the Danish Nobility, ennobled Sea Captain Peder Bagge was issued from the family.

Members in selection
Fredrik Bagge (1646-1713)
Peter Bagge (1710-1779), merchant, Member of the Riksdag
Christian Bagge (1722-1773), Swedish consul in Tripoli
Peter Bagge (1743-1819), forge patron
Daniel Benjamin Bagge (1769-1836)
Samuel Bagge (1774-1814), engineer, major
Martin Bagge (1790-1856)
Jonas Bagge (1800-1869)
Jonas Samuel Bagge (1803-1870)
Julius Bagge (1844-1890)
Peter Fredrik Leo Bagge (1850-1926)

Cadet branches

Bagge af Holmegaard
One branch through Peder Bagge was conferred Danish nobility in 1582 for war deeds.

Samuel Bagge
The engineer, Major Samuel Bagge made contributions to several national engineering endeavours, including the Göta Canal. In the Revolution of 1809 he served as an envoy between the parties of Herman Wedel Jarlsberg/Charles August, Crown Prince of Sweden, and Georg Adlersparre/Baltzar von Platen. Samuel Bagge was conferred Swedish nobility in 1814, but went under water in a storm in Vättern the same year. A street bears his name in Lerum, Västra Götaland County.

Further reading
 Genealogisk öfversikt öfver de ofrälse Bagge-släkterna i Sverige, Lorentz Bagge (1835-1916), Stockholm 1906

References

External links

Swedish families
Danish noble families